Hugh Baird Vallance (14 June 1905 – 19 June 1973) was a much-travelled English professional association football centre-forward.

Career
Vallance was born in Wolverhampton and after serving in the army as a guardsman began his football career with Kidderminster Harriers. He moved to Aston Villa in 1927, but left to join Queens Park Rangers without having broken into the first team. He made just one appearance for Rangers before moving to Brighton & Hove Albion in the spring of 1929. He was given his chance by Brighton manager Charlie Webb and soon established himself in the Brighton attack alongside Dan Kirkwood. In the 1929–30 season, Vallance scored four hat-tricks before the end of the year. By the end of the season, Vallance had scored 30 league goals in 37 games, while his strike partner Kirkwood had netted 38 in 40. The following season, Vallance scored twice in the first seven games before his Brighton contract was terminated for a "serious misdemeanour" at the same time as that of Ireland international Jack Curran.

He joined Worcester City and within six months went to Evesham Town and Tunbridge Wells Rangers before returning to the league with Gillingham. Despite 7 goals in 13 league games he was released and rejoined Kidderminster Harriers. His next move was to France and Nîmes Olympique, from where he moved to FC Basel. From Switzerland he moved to the less exotic Brierley Hill Alliance before returning to Gillingham. After 3 goals in 5 league games, Vallance moved to Racing Club de Paris and subsequently played for Cork City before ending his career with Evesham Town.

After leaving professional football Vallance served in the Royal Air Force. Vallance died in Birmingham in 1973.

References

1905 births
1973 deaths
Date of death missing
Footballers from Wolverhampton
English footballers
Kidderminster Harriers F.C. players
Aston Villa F.C. players
Queens Park Rangers F.C. players
Brighton & Hove Albion F.C. players
Gillingham F.C. players
Worcester City F.C. players
Nîmes Olympique players
FC Basel players
Brierley Hill Alliance F.C. players
Racing Club de France Football players
English Football League players
League of Ireland players
Ligue 1 players
English expatriate footballers
Expatriate footballers in France
Tunbridge Wells F.C. players
Evesham Town F.C. players
Cork City F.C. (1938–1940) players
Association football forwards
20th-century Royal Air Force personnel